Lokitanyala may refer to one of the following:

 Lokitanyala, Kenya, a settlement in West Pokot County, Kenya
 Lokitanyala, Uganda, a settlement in Moroto District, Uganda